The indigenous peoples of Brunei are Bruneian people who belong to the ethnic groups considered indigenous to the country. It is more commonly attributed to indigenous people of the Malay race belonging to the seven ethnic groups, namely: Brunei, Tutong, Belait, Dusun, Murut, Kedayan and Bisaya. The local term  refers to citizens of indigenous descent, in particular the aforementioned seven ethnic groups. The term  has also been sometimes used to refer to the indigenous peoples.

Definition 
According to the Brunei Nationality Act, the indigenous people of Brunei are mainly classified into Malays and non-Malays. Indigenous Malays comprise the following ethnic groups:

 Brunei
 Tutong
 Belait
 Dusun
 Murut
 Kedayan
 Bisaya

Meanwhile the indigenous people other than the Malays are defined in the First Schedule of the Act to comprise the following ethnic groups:

 Bukitans
 Dayaks (sea)
 Dayaks (land)
 Kelabits
 Kayans
 Kenyahs (including Sabups and Sipengs)
 Kajangs (including Sekapans, Kejamans, Lahanans, Punans, Tanjongs and Kanowits)
 Lugats
 Lisums
 Melanaus
 Penans
 Sians
 Tagals
 Tabuns
 Ukits

Precedence 
(translates as "Landless Indigenous Citizens' Scheme") is a public housing scheme which allows the  people to acquire land and home in the allocated public housing estates. The Royal Brunei Armed Forces primarily employ the indigenous Malays. In the Brunei Constitution, the government ministers and deputy ministers must be of "the Malay race professing the Islamic Religion, save where His Majesty the Sultan and Yang Di-Pertuan otherwise decides."

Concerns 
One case of such disadvantage can be seen in the demise of the construction industry in Brunei. The building sector is a major employer of Bumiputeras and forms the lifeblood of many Bumiputera families.

According to Minority Rights Group International, the non-Muslim indigenous people are continuously "banned" from conducting non-Islamic religious activities, and "pressured" and "incentivized" to convert to Islam. It also claimed that the government policy and legislation discourage indigenous cultures and languages.

There is a lack of "opposition" to the  concept in Brunei due to the country being an autocratic sultanate and the lack of political diversity.

See also
Bumiputera (Malaysia)
Malayness
Pribumi (Native Indonesians)
Malay world
Malay Archipelago
East Indies
Malay race
Maphilindo
Nusantara
Greater Indonesia

Notes and references

Society of Brunei
Brunei